Minas Hatzisavvas (28 January 1948 – 30 November 2015) was a Greek actor. He appeared in many films, television series and theatre plays with great success. He initially studied in France and later at the National Theatre of Greece Drama School in Athens. He played his first role in 1965 in Ancient Theatre of Dodona. It was the role of Paris in Rhesus of Euripides.

His debut in cinema was in 1970. From that point on, he appeared in many films and won four film awards as  both a leading and supporting actor for the films Ta Paidia tou Kronou, Kleisti Strofi, Lilly's Story and Worlds apart. He was bestowed with two television awards respectively for the television series I Agapi Argise mia Mera and Nyhterino Deltio.

Filmography

Awards

References

External links

1948 births
2015 deaths
Greek male film actors
Greek male television actors  
Greek male voice actors
Male actors from Athens
Greek gay actors
Greek gay writers
Greek LGBT screenwriters  
Gay screenwriters
20th-century Greek LGBT people
21st-century Greek LGBT people